Rheinheimera is a genus of bacteria from the family of Chromatiaceae. Rheinheimera is named after the German microbiologist Gerhard Rheinheimer.

References

Further reading 
 

Chromatiales
Bacteria genera
Taxa described in 2002